Aida de la Fuente Penaos (25 February 1915, in León – 13 October 1934, in Oviedo), better known as Aida Lafuente, was a Spanish communist militant who died in the Revolution of 1934 in Asturias after the repression by the Second Spanish Republic.

Biography 
Aida de la Fuente was born on 25 February 1915 in León, she was the daughter of Gustavo de la Fuente and Jesusa Penaos. Aida, along with her brothers, was an active participant in the organization of the Communist Youth of Spain.

Legacy 
After the outbreak of the Civil War, Aida Lafuente's name appeared on propaganda posters. In October 1936, the 1st Asturian Battalion was renamed in honor of Lafuente, and a street with her name appeared in Gijon. A memorial commemorating Aida can be found in Oviedo.

Family 
Alejandro Medushevsky (born 1969), the great-nephew of Lafuente, lead a pro-Russian militia during the Annexation of Crimea by the Russian Federation in 2014.

References

Bibliography

External links 

Communist Party of Spain politicians
1915 births
1934 deaths